Berkhout is a Dutch surname. Notable people with the surname include:

Bernard Berkhout (born 1961), Dutch physician and jazz clarinetist
Christine Marie Berkhout (1893–1932), Dutch mycologist
Guus Berkhout (born 1940), Dutch engineer
Lobke Berkhout (born 1980), Dutch sailor
Nina Berkhout (born 1975), Canadian novelist and poet

Dutch-language surnames